Weining Caohai Airport is an airport under construction in Weining County, Bijie, Guizhou, China. The airport is named after the Caohai Lake and nature reserve in Weining.

Construction started in March 2019 at a cost of 1,800 million Yuan, of which 1,064 million was financed by the national government, and 550 million by Guizhou province, with the remaining amount not yet accounted for. Test flights are expected to commence in the second half of 2023.

The airport will have a single  runway and facilities to handle up to 350,000 passengers yearly.

See also 

 Bijie Feixiong Airport

References 

Airports in Guizhou
Weining Yi, Hui, and Miao Autonomous County